Peter Kiesewetter (1 May 1945 – 4 December 2012) was a modern classical composer, born in Marktheidenfeld, Germany to Silesian parents.

External links 
 Interview with Peter Kiesewetter (in German)
 Short Portrait in English and German

References 

1945 births
2012 deaths
20th-century German composers